This article is a list of Ecuadorian artists.
 Aníbal Villacís (born 1927, Ambato)
 Araceli Gilbert (1913–1993)
 Caesar Andrade Faini (born 1913, Quito)
 Camilo Egas (1889–1962)
 Cecile Chong (born 1964)
 Eduardo Kingman (1913–1998, Quito)
 Efraín Andrade Viteri (1920–1997, Esmeraldas)
 Enrique Tábara (born 1930, Guayaquil)
 Estuardo Maldonado (born 1930, Pintag)
 Félix Arauz (born 1935, Guayaquil)
 George Febres (1943-1996)
 Gilberto Almeida
 Gonzalo Endara Crow (1936–1996, Bucay)
 Hugo Cifuentes (1923–2000, Otavalo)
 Humberto Moré
 Jaime Zapata
 Jorge Velarde (born 1960, Guayaquil)
 José Carreño (born 1947, Guayaquil)
 Juan Villafuerte (1945–1977, Guayaquil, Spain)
 Judith Gutiérrez (1927–2003,  Babahoyo)
 Luis Miranda (born 1932)
 Luis Molinari (born 1929, Guayaquil)
 Manuel Rendón (1894–1982, Paris, Portugal)
 Marcos Restrepo (born 1961, Catarama)
 Miguel Betancourt (born 1958, Quito)
 Oscar Santillan (born 1980, Milagro)
 Oswaldo Guayasamín (1919–1999, Quito)
 Oswaldo Moncayo (1923–1984, Riobamba)
 Oswaldo Viteri (b. Quito)
 Ramón Piaguaje
 Theo Constanté (born 1934, Guayaquil)
 Trude Sojka (1909 –2007 Berlín, Quito)
 Xavier Blum Pinto (born 1957)

See also 

 List of Latin American artists
 List of Ecuadorians

External links
WWAR

 List of Ecuadorian artists
Ecuadorian
Artists